Your Precious Love is Ronnie McDowell's 15th album, released on August 19, 1991. It is primarily a covers album of soul classics.

Critical reception

AllMusic gives Your Precious Love 3 out of a possible 5 stars.

Track listing

Track information and credits adapted from the album's liner notes.

Musicians

Ronnie McDowell – vocals, background vocals
David Briggs – keyboards
Biff Watson – keyboards
Lonnie Wilson – drums
Bob Wray – bass
Gary Lunn – bass
John Willis – guitar
Brent Rowan – guitar
Kenneth Bell – guitar
Don Potter – guitar
David Baker – guitar
Hurshel Wiginton – background vocals
Doug Clements – background vocals
Dennis Wilson – background vocals
Louis Nunley – background vocals
Wendy Johnson – background vocals
Jennifer O'Brien – background vocals
Lori Brooks – background vocals
Bill Conn – horns (Track 5)

Production

Buddy Killen – producer
Glenn Meadows – mastering
Milan Bogdan – digital editing

Charts

References

1991 albums